Happy New Year (sometimes abbreviated as HNY) is a 2014 Indian action comedy film directed by Farah Khan and produced by Gauri Khan under the banner of Red Chillies Entertainment. The film features an ensemble cast of Shah Rukh Khan, Deepika Padukone, Abhishek Bachchan, Sonu Sood, Boman Irani, Vivaan Shah and Jackie Shroff. It was distributed worldwide by Yash Raj Films. In the film, a bunch of losers transform themselves into a team that wins over the hearts of the people in the city and across the world, all as part of their quest to pull off the biggest diamond heist ever seen.

Happy New Year was released on Diwali 2014 with dubbed versions in Tamil and Telugu, and gained around 4,200 screens in Hindi and 800 screens in Tamil and Telugu, that was the biggest film release in India up until then. Despite mixed reviews from critics, who appreciated the cast performances especially Khan and Bachchan's, soundtrack, humor, cinematography, action sequences, production design and visual effects, but criticized the writing, length and pace, it grossed  in India on its opening day, .

At the 60th Filmfare Awards, Happy New Year received 2 nominations – Best Supporting Actor (Bachchan) and Best Female Playback Singer (Shreya Ghoshal for "Manwa Laage"). The Academy of Motion Picture Arts and Sciences features the film's script in their library.

Plot
Chandramohan "Charlie" Sharma is a street fighter who has been yearning for revenge from the renowned security supplier and owner of Shalimar Securities, Charan Grover, for eight years. Grover got Charlie's father, Manohar Sharma, wrongfully arrested as a thief because Grover had conned Manohar into stealing his own diamonds worth $15 million. Diamonds  worth 300 crore ($39.48 million) will reach the Atlantis Hotel, Dubai on Christmas Eve. Charlie wants to steal the diamonds and frame Grover. To accomplish this, he assembles a team; Ex-Captain Jagmohan "Jag" Prakash, a hard-of-hearing strongman, Tehamton Tammilo "Tammy" Irani, an old and seizure-prone safecracker who was Manohar's best friend, Rohan Singh, a young intelligent hacker who is Jag's nephew, and Nandu Bhide, a lookalike of Charan's son Vicky Grover.

Charlie explains to the team that room 9C in the hotel is connected to the vault which holds the diamonds through a duct system. However, room 9C is reserved for teams participating in the World Dance Championship (WDC). The group immediately refuses to join WDC, pointing out that none of them were dancers, but Charlie re-motivates the group, convincing them to become a dance team.

A flashback shows that Charan Grover met Manohar and gave him a contract to build an impenetrable vault, Shaalimar. After the vault was completed, Charan drugged Manohar and conned him into stealing the diamonds by using his fingerprints.

The groups tries to employ a dance instructor, to no avail; in desperation, Nandu introduces Charlie to Mohini, a Marathi bar dancer, who is impressed by Charlie's anglicised accent and eventually agrees to help them learn dancing, unaware of their intentions. Charlie and Mohini grow very close.

They manage to qualify in the first round and eventually win the competition to represent Team India in the WDC by gaining votes through hacking. Many viewers despise them for their lack of skill, but Charlie and his team (sans Mohini) are all only concerned with the heist. In Dubai, Team Korea is especially hostile towards Team India, including Grover, their sponsor. At the semifinal, Charlie saves a Korean team member from severe injury during a dance stunt, instantly gaining respect and admiration from the audience. After going over the plan, everything is ready. Unfortunately, the team learns that the diamonds will arrive on New Year's Eve instead of Christmas, which impedes the heist. Luckily, India advances to the finals after judges are moved by Charlie's action.

Mohini ends up hearing about the heist, and turns to leave. Charlie tells her everything, and reveals that Manohar is actually dead; following the arrest, he appealed for a trial, but Grover bribed Manohar's lawyers and tampered with the evidence. Manohar, with all hope lost, slit his wrist. However, this increases the team's determination to avenge Manohar. They share a special moment, where Mohini starts helping them.

The night of the final round, the heist is set in motion. Mohini lures Vicky into an elevator. He is knocked out, his thumbprint is taken by Jag, and used by Nandu who opens the chamber. Tammy successfully opens the safe. However, Charlie and Tammy find another glass safe which houses the diamonds. It was made by Manohar and had a 7 letter password. Charlie opens the safe, realizing that the password to open the safe was his own name. After stealing the diamonds, the team boards a boat, but Mohini refuses to come. She explains that the most important thing in life is respect. The whole of India was rooting for them, and she wasn't going to let India lose its respect. Rohan joins her as well, leading to a fight amongst the remaining members.

When Team India is found missing, Grover claims that they are the thieves. Mohini appears on stage, and performs alone for a few minutes. Soon after, the other members of the team appear, shocking Grover. Charlie makes an appearance in the end, and the team wins the competition. Charan and Vicky Grover are arrested. Charlie reveals himself to Charan and slips in his pocket the same razor blade Manohar slit his wrists with. He watches as the police take him away, his revenge fulfilled. Team India reach the airport. Charlie camouflages the diamonds in his soft-drink, but the security guard disposes of it, devastating the team. However, later during the flight, Charlie reveals that he switched the fake diamonds on the trophy with the real ones. The team reaches India.

In the post-credits scene, Nandu is thrown out of a bank for showing a winners' cheque. Rohan finally gains immense popularity among the girls, while Jag takes over directing the film being made earlier, with the original director being the bomb-controller (what Jag previously did). Tammy now has many of the elderly ladies chasing him as their hero. Having been given a long-term sentence, Charan and Vicky Grover are now seen in a Dubai city jail, still pleading for their innocence. Mohini opens her own dance School and Charlie proposes to her with a ring made from one of the diamonds. They all embrace, waving at the camera as the film ends.

Cast
 Shah Rukh Khan as Chandramohan "Charlie" Sharma, Manohar's son, Tammy, Jag, Rohan and Nandu's friend, Mohini's love interest.
 Deepika Padukone as Mohini Joshi, Charlie's love interest and Nandu's distant relative and the founder of "Mohini Dence School"
 Abhishek Bachchan in dual roles as
 Nandu Bhide, Charlie's friend
 Vicky Grover, Charan Grover's son
 Sonu Sood as Captain Jagmohan "Jag" Prakash Singh, Manohar and Charlie's close friend
 Boman Irani as Temhton "Tammy" Irani, Manohar and Charlie's close friend
 Vivaan Shah as Rohan Singh, Jag's nephew
 Jackie Shroff as Charan Grover, owner of Shalimar Securities who cheated Manohar and owns his company
 Jason Tham as Team Korea Leader
 Mohan Kapur as Subodh Singh, Charan's assistant
 Varun Pruthi as Charan's assistant Sartaj Gill
 Kavi Shastri as Mr. Suryakant Gupta
 Anupam Kher as Manohar Sharma, Charlie's father and an intelligent businessman (Flashback appearance)
 Daisy Irani as Namita Irani, Tammy's mother (extended cameo appearance)
 Sarah-Jane Dias as Laila: India's ambassador at WDC (extended cameo appearance)
 Dino Morea as Host of World Dance Championship (cameo appearance)
 Kiku Sharda as Saroj Khan (Cameo appearance)
 Prabhu Deva as Dance Instructor (cameo appearance)
 Malaika Arora as Manolika Jhawar, the heroine of a film (cameo appearance)
 Anurag Kashyap as Selection Judge of World Dance Championship Auditions  (cameo appearance)
 Vishal Dadlani as Selection Judge of World Dance Championship Auditions (Cameo appearance)
 Sajid Khan as Himself/Director of a film (special appearance)
 Geeta Kapoor as Herself/Judge of World Dance Championship (cameo appearance)

Production

Development
Plans for the film began as far back as 2005 with an ensemble cast of Amitabh Bachchan, Shah Rukh Khan, Akshay Kumar, Juhi Chawla, Manisha Koirala, Ameesha Patel, Priyanka Chopra, Raveena Tandon and Zayed Khan. The film was shelved for unknown reasons and instead, Farah Khan made Om Shanti Om (2007), which featured Khan and Padukone. After her film Tees Maar Khan (2010), Farah began to consider the possibilities of the film and screenwriting was completed by October 2012.

When the film was revived, the filmmakers wanted an established actress in the lead role opposite Khan. In December 2012, media reported that the makers had approached Priyanka Chopra for the role, who was their first choice for the film after the script was revamped. However, Chopra turned down the film due to dates issue; the schedule was clashing with another film she had signed. Several actresses were considered for the role, such as Sonakshi Sinha, Asin, Aishwarya Rai Bachchan, Parineeti Chopra and Katrina Kaif, however, Padukone was finalized, making it her third film opposite Khan following Om Shanti Om and Chennai Express (2013). Khan was reported to be playing the role of a con artist in the film which had Deepika in the role of a Marathi dancer. At a point, John Abraham was to play one of the supporting roles but Sonu Sood replaced him. Boman Irani was confirmed by the director during an interview. In August 2013, Jackie Shroff was finalised to play the film's antagonist. The director's brother, Sajid Khan, would be making a guest appearance while actress Malaika Arora Khan was also signed to appear in a cameo. Vivaan Shah was reported to play the role of a computer hacker. Actor-director Prabhu Deva performed a dance in a cameo.

Filming
Farah made the official announcement on Twitter. The first schedule of filming started in Dubai in early November 2013. Arabian Business reported that a major portion of the film will be shot in the prestigious Atlantis, The Palm.

On 23 January 2014, Shah Rukh Khan was injured while shooting at JW Marriott Hotel, Mumbai. Though reported as minor at first, he suffered a fractured shoulder and a torn left knee patella, being advised rest for a while.

Mehboob Studios was used as one of the major locations while certain portions were also filmed near the Wilson College. The final schedule was completed in August 2014.

Costume designs 
Farah Khan wanted Shah Rukh Khan to grow his hair long so that he could sport shoulder length tresses.

Marketing
For promotion, digitally personalized posters written in cast members' handwriting were made available to social media users. The team of Shahrukh Khan, Deepika Padukone, Boman Irani, Sonu Sood and Vivaan Shah went to the set of the famous Indian television show Tarak Mehta Ka Ooltah Chashma (TMKOC) for the promotion of their movie.

The film's cast and crew, along with rapper Yo Yo Honey Singh and actress Madhuri Dixit travelled on a promotional tour titled "SLAM!". Starting from 19 September in Houston, it took place in New Jersey, Washington, Toronto, Chicago, Vancouver and San Jose. "SLAM!" also continued to United Kingdom on 5 October.

On 13 October 2014, an official game based on the film, titled Happy New Year-The Game was released for Android and iOS. It was made in collaboration with the production company and Gameshastra India, an Indian game art outsourcing studio.

Distribution rights 

Music

The music of Happy New Year is composed by the duo of Vishal–Shekhar while the lyrics are penned by Irshad Kamil. The full soundtrack was launched on 1 October 2014. Prior to that, promotional music videos were released for "Indiawaale" on 21 September and "Manwa Laage" on 25 September respectively. After the album was launched, promotional videos of the songs "Lovely", "Nonsense Ki Night" and "Satakli" were also released. "India Waale" is featured in Just Dance Now, Just Dance 2015 (as downloadable content) and is part of the Just Dance Unlimited service.

Reception
The soundtrack received mostly positive reviews from music critics.

Kasmin Fernandes at The Times of India felt, "As a heist film centred around a dance competition, Happy New Year provides plenty of fodder for composers Vishal and Shekhar and lyricist Irshad Kamil to showcase their way with sounds. And they've delivered, with seven original tracks, one electronic version, a variation, a medley and an instrumental number." Rohit Vats for Hindustan Times gave the album 3 out of 5 stars stated, "Farah Khan looks more concerned about the feel of her film than the quality of the songs, and it prompts her to go with trendy tunes. Overall, the album is average and is only youth oriented. Acquiring longevity will be difficult for this album." For India.com, Prathamesh Jadhav wrote, "It's a mixed bag!" On the contrary critic Surabhi Redkar for Koimoi felt, "The Happy New Year album is not as extravagant as the film looks. With an expectation of a Bollywood musical soundtrack, it comes down to a regular album of Vishal-Shekhar. Even though the album will be a hit with tracks such as 'Manwa Laage' and 'Kamli', it will not enjoy much longevity."

Box office

Worldwide, the film grossed  worldwide, making it one of the highest-grossing Indian films of all time.

India 
Happy New Year set a record by collecting 44.97 crore, making it the first Bollywood film to reach the figure in a single day. The record was broken by the 2018 Diwali release Thugs of Hindostan starring Aamir Khan, Amitabh Bachchan, Katrina Kaif and Fatima Sana Shaikh which collected 52.25 crore on Day 1 which is currently 2nd highest for any Bollywood film and this record is broken by War which collected 53.35 crore on Day 1 The film witnessed a drop on Saturday when it earned 285million nett and collections on Sunday were in the same range, taking the opening weekend to a record 970million nett. The film grossed around 1.75billion in its first weekend worldwide, the second highest opening for a Hindi film after Dhoom 3.

The film grossed around 122.5million nett on its first Monday to take its total to 1.09billion in four days. It earned 110million nett on its first Tuesday as the film had a decent hold from Monday in a few circuits, taking its total to a huge 1.20billion nett in five days. Happy New Year grossed a huge 1.34billion nett in its first week. The film had a strong weekend and its all India collections were good on Monday and Tuesday but it fell on Wednesday. The huge first week gave the film a massive distributor share of 770million approx.
The film grossed 2.45billion worldwide in its first week which was the fourth highest total ever behind Dhoom 3, Kick and Chennai Express.
The Tamil and Telugu versions of the film grossed 11million nett and 26million nett respectively in first week.

Happy New Year had good collections on second Friday of around 45million nett. The film showed huge growth on its second Saturday and Sunday to gross around 67.5million nett and 92.5million nett respectively. Happy New Year grossed around 202.5million in second weekend to take its ten-day total to 1.54billion nett. The film grossed around 30million nett on second Monday, 40million nett on second Tuesday and 27.5million nett on second Wednesday. Happy New Year grossed around 353.8million nett in its second week to take its total to 1.685billion nett.
It grossed around 45million nett over its third weekend to take its total to 1.73billion nett. Happy New Year grossed around 77.5million nett in week three taking its total to a little over 1.76billion nett.

Happy New Year grossed 15.6million nett in week four and 3.4million nett in week five taking its final total to 1.83billion nett.
Box Office India declared Happy New Year a "Super Hit". Its final domestic gross was 295crore (US$million).

Overseas 
Happy New Year recorded the second highest overseas opening weekend of all time with figures of US$8.1 million (498 million). The film had an all-time record opening in the Gulf, Nepal, Sri Lanka, South Africa, Malaysia, Thailand, Hong Kong and Germany.
In the opening weekend, the film grossed US$2.9 million (178 million) in the Gulf, $2 million (123 million) in US/Canada, £570,000 (56 million) in United Kingdom, A$380,000 (20.5 million) in Australia, and PKR 62 million (US$600,000, INR 37 million) in Pakistan.
Happy New Year took the all-time best ever opening for a Hindi film in Germany as it grossed $94,000 on its first day of release. Dhoom 3 had grossed $86,000 over the weekend and My Name Is Khan was $98,000 over the weekend.

At the end of its theatrical run overseas, the film earned US$16.71 million (102 crore) in overseas markets. It is one of the highest-grossing Indian films ever in overseas markets.

The film released in China on 12 February 2015. It went on to gross $500,000 at the Chinese box office.

Critical reception
The film received mixed reviews from critics in India and overseas. It holds a 57% rating on Rotten Tomatoes, based on 14 reviews. While the performances of the lead cast, and the humor content received praise, the lack of character development and the 'unoriginal' plot received criticism.

Domestic

Rajeev Masand of CNN-IBN gave 2.5 stars out of 5, commenting "You'll find yourself chuckling and cringing alternately while watching Happy New Year, in which director Farah Khan skillfully sets up a heist plot against an international dance competition scenario. Its a curious premise, and Farah brings many of the same elements that she applied to good use in Main Hoon Na and Om Shanti Om, namely lots of self-referencing, affectionate nods to 70s Bollywood, and the ability to occasionally laugh at oneself." Anupama Chopra gave 2 out of 5 stars and said "It is frantic, noisy, gaudy and, largely, joyless. Farah takes the framework of the traditional heist movie and bungs in revenge, melodrama, comedy, romance, countless dazzling dance sequences and, as a climactic flourish, a dose of patriotism."

Saurabh Gupta of Indian Express rated the film 2 out of 5 stars calling it a "Mera Bharat Mahan sentiments" type movie, and a cross between an Ocean's 11/12 and "Flashdance". Rediff rated the film 2 out of 5 stars, and said "the film plays out like a spoof from the get go, a gigantic lark where nothing is taken seriously". NDTV also rated the film 2 out of 5 stars and said that irrespective of earnings at the box office, it "has nothing new to offer". Mihir Fadnavis of First Post said that, "the movie looks and feels like a home video project that was intended for appreciation by precisely two people in the entire universe – Farah and Shah Rukh Khan" and appears to be "Ocean's 11 rewritten by baboons". Rohit Vats of Hindustan Times gave the film 2.5 out of 5 stars taking on originality, said that "Originality? What's that, ask Farah Khan in Happy New Year".

International
Shilpa Jamkhandikar of Reuters said that the film has liberally borrowed from Hollywood heist films, in particular from Steven Soderbergh's Ocean's Eleven. "The first half is lighter and genuinely funny at times, but as the second half wears on, the proceedings become monotonous". Lisa Tsering of The Hollywood Reporter reviewed film as, "an ambitious musical, a love story and an Ocean's 11-style crime caper". Sami Qahar of the Dawn gave the film 2.5 out 5 stars and said the film is "Ocean's Eleven plus Italian Job plus Step Up all in one...on cheap shape-deteriorating steroids."

Awards and nominations

Controversy
Bollywood film choreographer Saroj Khan reportedly got upset after being parodied in the film. Farah Khan denied having spoofed Saroj Khan. Farah had earlier allegedly spoofed Manoj Kumar in her 2007 film Om Shanti Om.

Jaya Bachchan described Happy New Year as a "nonsensical film" and she said, "I only watched it because Abhishek is in it. I told him that he is a great actor if he can act stupid in front of the camera like that."

References

External links
 
 
 

2014 films
2014 action comedy films
2010s heist films
2010s musical comedy films
2010s Hindi-language films
Indian action comedy films
Indian musical comedy films
Indian heist films
Films directed by Farah Khan
Films scored by Vishal–Shekhar
Films set in Dubai
Films distributed by Yash Raj Films
Red Chillies Entertainment films
Films about prostitution in India
Indian dance films